Wang Guoquan (1911–2004) was a Chinese diplomat. He was born in Gongyi, Henan. He was a graduate of Henan University. He was governor, Communist Party of China Committee Secretary and delegate to the National People's Congress from Rehe Province. He was a delegate to the 1st National People's Congress (1954–1959), 2nd National People's Congress (1959–1964), 3rd National People's Congress (1964–1975) and 6th National People's Congress (1983–1988). He was Ambassador of the People's Republic of China to East Germany (1956–1964), Poland (1964–1970), Australia (1973–1975) and Italy (1977–1978). 

1911 births
2004 deaths
Ambassadors of China to East Germany
Ambassadors of China to Poland
Ambassadors of China to Australia
Ambassadors of China to Italy
Delegates to the 1st National People's Congress
Delegates to the 2nd National People's Congress
Delegates to the 3rd National People's Congress
Delegates to the 6th National People's Congress
Governors of Rehe Province
Delegates to the National People's Congress from Rehe Province
Communist Party secretaries of Rehe Province
Henan University alumni
People from Gongyi
Chinese Communist Party politicians from Henan
People's Republic of China politicians from Henan
Politicians from Zhengzhou